Betoambari Airport  is an airport near Baubau, a city in the province of Southeast Sulawesi, Indonesia.

Facilities

Airlines and destinations

References

Airports in Southeast Sulawesi